Ronald Stein (April 12, 1930 – August 15, 1988)  was an American film composer.

Biography
Born in St. Louis, Missouri, Stein wrote scores for many low budget horror and exploitation films during the 1950s and 1960s, most of which were released by American International Pictures. These included It Conquered the World, Attack of the Crab Monsters, Invasion of the Saucer Men, Attack of the 50 Foot Woman, Hot Rod Gang, The Premature Burial and The Haunted Palace. He also provided scores for major studio productions such as Francis Ford Coppola's The Rain People, and  Richard Rush's Getting Straight.

Stein taught composition at California State University, Northridge.  Stein also taught composition, arranging, orchestration and theory at the University of Colorado Denver in the mid to late 1980s.

His song "Pigs Go Home" was sampled by rapper Eminem for his 1999 song "Guilty Conscience".

Some of Stein's papers and scores, especially for the films Not of This Earth and Of Love and Desire can be found in the archives of the Music Library at Washington University in St. Louis.

Stein died from pancreatic cancer in Los Angeles, California, in 1988. His son, Victor Warren (birth name, Victor Warren Stein), is an actor, writer, director, and producer with his own production company Glydascope inc in Los Angeles, California

Selected filmography

Apache Woman (1955)
The Phantom from 10,000 Leagues (1955)
Day the World Ended (1955)
Gunslinger (1956)
The Oklahoma Woman (1956)
Girls in Prison (1956)
It Conquered the World (1956)
The She-Creature (1956)
Flesh and the Spur (1956)
Runaway Daughters (1956)
Naked Paradise (1957)
Not of This Earth (1957)
Attack of the Crab Monsters (1957)
Invasion of the Saucer Men (1957)
Reform School Girl (1957)
Sorority Girl (1957)
The Undead (1957)
Dragstrip Girl (1957)
Jet Attack (1958)
Suicide Battalion (1958)
Attack of the 50 Foot Woman (1958)
The Bonnie Parker Story (1958)
High School Hellcats (1958)
Hot Rod Gang (1958)
She Gods of Shark Reef (1958)
Devil's Partner (1958)
Paratroop Command (1959)
Tank Commando (1959)
The Legend of Tom Dooley (1959)
 Diary of a High School Bride (1959)
Ghost of Dragstrip Hollow (1959)
Last Woman on Earth (1960)
Too Soon to Love (1960)
The Threat (1960)
The Girl in Lovers Lane (1960)
Dinosaurus! (1960)
Raymie (1960)
The Little Shop of Horrors (1960)
Atlas (1961)
The Bashful Elephant (1961)
War Is Hell (1961)
Journey to the Seventh Planet (1962)
The Underwater City (1962)
The Premature Burial (1962)
Warriors Five (1962)
Dime with a Halo (1963)
The Terror (1963)
The Young and The Brave (1963)
The Haunted Palace (1963)
Of Love and Desire (1963)
Dementia 13 (1963)
Requiem for a Gunfighter (1965)
The Bounty Killer (1965)
Voyage to the Prehistoric Planet (1965)
Blood Bath (1966)
Spider Baby (1968)
Psych-Out (1968)
The Rain People (1969)
Getting Straight (1970)
Frankenstein's Great Aunt Tillie (1984)
The Naked Monster (2005)

References

External links
 

1930 births
1988 deaths
American film score composers
American male film score composers
Musicians from St. Louis
Deaths from pancreatic cancer
20th-century classical musicians
20th-century American composers
20th-century American male musicians